Yehezkel Lazarov (born 8 February 1974) is an Israeli actor, director, and multidisciplinary artist. In 2022 he was elected to serve as the head of the school of Performing Arts at the Kibbutzim Seminary College.

Biography 
As a child, Lazarov performed as a professional tap dancer in musicals. After graduating from the High School of Arts as a ballet dancer and serving as a singer in a military band, he danced with the Batsheva Dance Company for four years. He studied theater at the Actors’ Centre in London before joining the Gesher Theatre and the Cameri Theatre as an actor.

His leading roles include Tevye in the 2018 Broadway National Tour of Fiddler on the Roof, Mack the Knife in The Threepenny Opera at the Gesher Theatre (winning the Israeli Theatre Award for best actor), Lysander in A Midsummer Night’s Dream, Figaro in The Marriage of Figaro, Avigdor in Yentl, Alexander Pen in Was It a Dream?, Rudi in The Aristocrats, the titular roles in Sholom Aleichem's Stempenyu and The Picture of Dorian Gray, and Zach in A Chorus Line. In addition to his work as an actor, Lazarov has served as the in-house choreographer at the Gesher Theatre and Cameri Theatre.

Lazarov has played leading roles in more than 40 films and television productions, including The Mentalist, Mama’s Angel (Series Mania – Official Competition, France), the Israeli films The Kindergarten Teacher and The Debt, Fragile, Russian episodic series Mata Hari, The Fifth Heaven, Waltz with Bashir (winning the Golden Globe Award for Best Foreign Language Film), Three Mothers, A Touch Away, and The Dybbuk (nominated for best actor).

As a theater director, Lazarov has served as the adapter, set designer, and choreographer for all his projects, including Lolita / Joan of Arc, Fathers and Sons, Alice, Falling Out of Time (based on the David Grossman novel) at the Gesher Theater, The Picture of Dorian Gray at the Habima Theatre, and Igloo (written by Lazarov), which premiered at the Israel Festival and won the Best Director award.

Lazarov is the artistic director and founder of Studio Ankori Middle and High School for Creative Thinking and Entrepreneurship. He is the co-founder, artistic director, and curator of AZA13, an art venue in Tel Aviv. Among his multidisciplinary exhibitions are "Hope", "Censorship", "Demonstration", and "The Art to Survive".

As a visual artist, Lazarov's photography and video artworks have been shown in several gallery exhibitions. He has written and directed a number of short films, including Snow and Lashabiya, which have been screened in many international film festivals.

Filmography

Film/Television

Theater

Theatre Director

Short films

References

External links 
 
 

Israeli male film actors
Male actors from Tel Aviv
Thelma Yellin High School of Arts alumni
1974 births
Living people
Israeli male television actors
Israeli male voice actors
Israeli male stage actors
Israeli people of Bulgarian-Jewish descent
Israeli people of Uzbekistani-Jewish descent